James Hayward (born 1943, San Francisco, California) is a contemporary abstract painter who lives and works in Moorpark, California. Hayward's paintings are usually divided in two bodies of work: flat paintings (1975-1984) and thick paintings (1984 to the present).  He works in series, some of which are ongoing, and include The Annunciations, The Stations of the Cross, the Red Maps, Fire Paintings, Smoke Paintings, Sacred and Profane and Nothing's Perfect series.

Education and teaching 

Hayward got his Bachelor of Arts at San Diego State University, San Diego, CA, studied in the Graduate art program at the University of California, Los Angeles (UCLA) from 1966 to 1969 and got his Master of Fine Arts at the University of Washington, Seattle in 1972.

Taught:
1994-2012 — Art Center College of Design, Pasadena, CA, Graduate Art Programs
1999 — University of California, Los Angeles (winter quarter)
1997 — University of Texas at San Antonio (guest artist / fall semester)
1992-1995 — University of California, Los Angeles
1987 — University of Southern California, Los Angeles, CA (guest artist / spring quarter)
1985 — College of Creative Studies, University of California, Santa Barbara
1983 — University of California, Berkeley, CA (guest artist)
1980 — Minneapolis College of Art & Design, Minneapolis, Minnesota (guest artist)
1979 — California State University, Bakersfield (guest artist)
1976-1978 — College of Creative Studies, University of California, Santa Barbara, CA

Exhibitions 

Hayward has exhibited extensively, particularly in California, since his first show solo show in 1976.  He has exhibited at historically significant galleries such as Claire S. Copley Gallery, Riko Mizuno Gallery and Rosamund Felsen Gallery in Los Angeles and Sidney Janis Gallery in New York, and his work has been included in museum exhibitions in institutions such as the Museum of Contemporary Art, Los Angeles, Los Angeles County Museum of Art, San Francisco Museum of Modern Art, Hirschorn Museum, Washington D.C., The Renaissance Society At The University Of Chicago, and the Institute of Contemporary Art (ICA) in London, U.K. among others.  Through the 1990s and 2000s he exhibited extensively at Modernism, San Francisco and Ace Contemporary Exhibitions in Los Angeles.  Artist Mike Kelley curated a solo exhibition of his work in 2005 at the Cue Art Foundation in New York calling Hayward "one of the few truly important West Coast Painters."  Also in 2005, critic and educator Dave Hickey included his work in a curated show entitled Step into Liquid, at the Ben Maltz Gallery, Otis College of Art and Design, Los Angeles.

Recently Hayward's work has been included in [http://sites.moca.org/blacksun/2011/09/27/james-hayward-automatic-painting-43-x-33-green-1977/ "Under the Big Black Sun"] at the Museum of Contemporary Art, Los Angeles, curated by Paul Schimmel in 2011, a solo exhibition at Richard Telles Fine Art, Los Angeles James Hayward Paintings from the 70's in conjunction with the Getty's Pacific Standard Time exhibition in 2011  and his Annunciation paintings have been shown in the solo exhibition Variations on the Annunciation at Meliksetian | Briggs in Los Angeles in 2013.

 Works in institutional and museum collections 

Museum of Contemporary Art, Los Angeles, California
San Francisco Museum of Modern Art, California
Los Angeles County Museum of Art, California
Cleveland Museum of Art, Cleveland, Ohio
Albright-Knox Gallery, Buffalo, New York
San Jose Museum of Art, San Jose, California
Minneapolis Institute of the Arts, Minneapolis, Minnesota
Denver Museum of Modern Art, Denver, Colorado
Orange County Museum of Art, Newport Beach, California
Laguna Beach Museum of Art, Laguna Beach, California
University Art Museum, Santa Barbara, California
Museum of Contemporary Art, North Miami, Florida
Weisman Museum of Art, Pepperdine University, Malibu, California
Anderson School of Business, University of California, Los Angeles, California

 Honors and awards 

1977 — Young Talent Award, Los Angeles County Museum of Art
1981 — Japan-United States Creative Arts Fellowship
1983 — John Simon Guggenheim Memorial Fellowship
1991 — Awards in the Visual Arts 10 Grant
1993 — National Endowment for the Arts Fellowship
1996 — Pollock-Krasner Foundation Grant

 Writing 

In 2010, Hayward produced a book of short stories entitled Indiscretion: Selected Stories, based on his reminiscences, "war stories" as his close friend artist Ed Moses calls them. Writing in The Huffington Post, Gordy Grundy calls it "a chronicle of a ribald life in the arts as well as a glimpse of SoCal living".

 Notes 

 References 

Carlson, Ben. James Hayward At Richard Telles Fine Art, Artforum, February 2012 Vol. 50, No. 6, P. 235.
Schimmel, Paul (Editor), Mark, Lisa Gabrielle (Editor), Colpitt, Frances (Contributor), Crow, Thomas (Contributor), Desmarais, Charles (Contributor), Under the Big Black Sun; California Art 1974-1981, Prestel Publishing, 2011.
Colpitt, Frances. Marks And Movement: Five Painters, catalogue, Barrett Art Gallery, Santa Monica, CA, 2011.
Pagel, David.  Take Pleasure In Monochrome, Los Angeles Times. April 11, 2008 P.E19
Baker, Kenneth. James Hayward Pursues A Kind Of ‘Pure Painting’  San Francisco Chronicle, September 15, 2007 P. E1.
Frank, Peter. James Hayward. Artus, Issue 17 March–April 2007, P. 28.
Melrod, George. James Hayward: Monster Of Monochrome,  Art Ltd, January 200 P. 38 to 45.
Hickey, Dave, Colpitt Frances, Smith Jason. "James Hayward Works 1975-2007. Modernism Inc., 2007.
Knight, Christopher. Just Going With The Flow, Los Angeles Times, January 14, 2006 P. E 2.
Colpitt, Frances & Gilbert-Rolfe. Jeremy, Monster Of Monochrome, Mandarin Press, Los Angeles 2006.
Kelley, Mike. James Hayward, catalogue, Cue Art Foundation, New York, 2005.
Knight, Christopher. Earthly Creators Find The Divine In Their Details, Los Angeles Times, August 11, 2004, P. E1.
Pagel, David. Celebrating Paint’s Physicality, Los Angeles Times, August 1, 2003, Calendar.
Hickey, Dave, Pagel, David and Scanlan, Joe. Plane/Structures, catalogue, The Fellows Of Contemporary Art, Los Angeles, CA 1994.
Colpitt, Frances. Mapping, catalogue, The University Of Texas, San Antonio, 1994.
Colpitt, Frances. In Plain Sight: Abstract Painting In Los Angeles, catalogue. Blue Star Art Space, San Antonio, Texas 1994.
Rutter, Virginia S, Kopf, Vicki, Fleming, Jeff. Awards In The Visual Arts 10, catalogue, Southeastern Center for Contemporary Art, 1991.
Plous, Phylis & Colpitt, Frances.  Abstract Options, catalogue, The National Endowment For The Arts, 1989.

1943 births
20th-century American painters
American male painters
21st-century American painters
21st-century American male artists
American contemporary painters
Artists from Los Angeles
Living people
Painters from California
University of Washington alumni
People from Moorpark, California
20th-century American male artists